Warburto Point is a headland located on the west coast of the Yorke Peninsula in South Australia about  south west of the town of Wallaroo. Since 1995, it has been the site of a navigation aid in the form of a light tower which was commissioned to replace the lighthouse on Tiparra Reef. It is also the site of a coastal weather station operated by the Australian Bureau of Meteorology.

References

Headlands of South Australia
Yorke Peninsula
Spencer Gulf